Water polo events were contested at the 1995 Summer Universiade in Fukuoka, Japan.

References
 Universiade water polo medalists on HickokSports

1995 Summer Universiade
Universiade
1995
1995